Janet Elizabeth Finch-Saunders (born 1958) is a Welsh Conservative Party politician. She is the Member of the Senedd for the Aberconwy constituency.

Political career
Janet previously represented the Craig-Y-Don ward on Llandudno Town Council, and Conwy County Borough Council. In the 2003 Senedd election, Janet stood unsuccessfully as the Conservative candidate for Wrexham and was third on the regional party list. Elected in 2004, she was appointed to the Cabinet with overall responsibility for Community Safety and Public Protection matters. During her time as a Councillor, Janet was Chair of the Principal Scrutiny Committee and Leader of the Welsh Conservative Group. In 2004, Janet was elected as the Mayor of Llandudno, following in the footsteps of her parents.

In July 2010, following the first open primary selection to be held in the target seat of Aberconwy, Janet was selected as the Conservative Senedd candidate. In January 2011, she was appointed Policy Adviser by leader of the Welsh Conservatives. In this role she advised Nick Bourne AM on policy involving local government. She was subsequently elected as the Assembly Member for Aberconwy in the 2011 National Assembly for Wales election.

She initiated the Cross-Party Group on Small Shops during the Fourth Assembly. 

In the 2016 Senedd election, she retained her seat, becoming the first person to be re-elected consecutively since the constituency's inception. Janet served as Shadow Cabinet Secretary for Local Government from 2011 to 2018, before becoming the party's Shadow Minister for Social Care, Children, Young People, and Older People. 

During the fifth Senedd, she was the Chair of the Welsh Conservative Group in the Senedd. From July 2018 until January 2019, Finch-Saunders employed her husband as office manager. In 2019, Janet was elected Chair of the Petitions Committee. In 2020, Janet was made the Shadow Minister for Environment, Energy and Rural Affairs.

In the 2021 Senedd election, Janet held the seat with an increased majority of 3,336 and securing 41.69% of the vote. In May 2021, she was appointed as the Shadow Minister for Climate Change.

In 2022, reports emerged that she had allegedly been mistreating her office staff.

Personal life 
Finch-Sanders lives in Llandudno and has two children with her husband, Gareth. An entrepreneur, Janet has founded a number of local businesses. A keen sailor, she is also passionate about animals and marine conservation.

Finch-Saunders owns 7 residential and 4 retail properties and is a trustee of a further two residential properties in Llandudno.

References

External links
Janet Finch-Saunders Official website

Offices held

1958 births
Living people
Conservative Party members of the Senedd
Female members of the Senedd
Councillors in Wales
Wales AMs 2011–2016
Wales MSs 2016–2021
Wales MSs 2021–2026
School governors
People from Llandudno
Welsh sailors
Welsh environmentalists
Women councillors in Wales